"I Like Your Kind of Love" is a song written by Melvin Endsley, and performed by Andy Williams, with additional vocals by Peggy Powers.  Archie Bleyer's Orchestra played on the song.

Chart performance
In the US, "I Like Your Kind of Love" reached number 8 on the Billboard chart, and outside the US, it peaked at number 16 in the UK in 1957.

Cover versions
Endsley also recorded a version of the song while he was under contract with RCA Records in 1957.

References

1957 singles
Songs written by Melvin Endsley
Andy Williams songs
Cadence Records singles
1957 songs